Joker was an American men's digest published by Humorama. The magazine was launched in Spring 1942. The publisher was Abe Goodman, brother of American publisher Martin Goodman.

References

Defunct magazines published in the United States
Magazines established in 1942
Men's magazines published in the United States
Magazines with year of disestablishment missing